John 1:20 is the twentieth verse in the first chapter of the Gospel of John in the New Testament of the Christian Bible.

Content
In the original Greek according to Westcott-Hort this verse is:
Καὶ ὡμολόγησε, καὶ οὐκ ἠρνήσατο· καὶ ὡμολόγησεν ὅτι Οὐκ εἰμὶ ἐγὼ ὁ Χριστός.

In the King James Version of the Bible the text reads:
And he confessed, and denied not; but confessed, I am not the Christ.

The New International Version translates the passage as:
He did not fail to confess, but confessed freely, "I am not the Christ. "

Analysis
MacEvilly explains that since John denied that he was the Christ, the messengers asked him if he were Elijah, because God took him away, so that he might be the forerunner of Christ. Therefore, the Jews of the time were then in expectation. As we read in Malachi 4:5, “Behold, I send you Elijah the prophet before the great and terrible day of the Lord come,” which speaks of the day of judgment, when Christ will return as Judge of the world. Still, according to Lapide, it appears the Scribes did not understand this, assuming instead there would be only one advent of Christ, for which the precursor would be Elijah. However, according to Malachi 3:1 there would be another precursor of Christ: “For I,” saith the Lord, “do send My messenger, and he shall prepare My way before My face.”

Commentary from the Church Fathers
Origen: "John, as it appears, saw from the question, that the Priests and Levites had doubts whether it might not be the Christ, who was baptizing; which doubts however they were afraid to profess openly, for fear of incurring the charge of credulity. He wisely determines therefore first to correct their mistake, and then to proclaim the truth. Accordingly, he first of all shows that he is not the Christ: And he confessed, and denied not; but confessed, I am not the Christ. We may add here, that at this time the people had already begun to be impressed with the idea that Christ’s advent was at hand, in consequence of the interpretations which the lawyers had collected out of the sacred writings to that effect. Thus Theudas had been enabled to collect together a considerable body, on the strength of his pretending to be the Christ; and after him Judas, in the days of the, taxation, had done the same. (Acts 5) Such being the strong expectation of Christ’s advent then prevalent, the Jews send to John, intending by the question, Who art thou? to extract from him whether he were the Christ."

Gregory the Great: "He denied directly being what he was not, but he did not deny what he was: thus, by his speaking truth, becoming a true member of Him Whose name he had not dishonestly usurped."

References

External links
Other translations of John 1:20 at BibleHub

01:20